Crowhurst is a civil parish and dispersed village in a rural part of the Tandridge district of Surrey, England. Rated two architectural categories higher than the medieval church is the Renaissance manor, Crowhurst Place, which is a Grade I listed building.

Landmarks

St George's Church
The parish church is dedicated to St George, and is architecturally Grade II listed, mostly built from the 12th to the 15th centuries, has a chancel that was repaired and made plain in 1657. The spire was rebuilt after a fire in 1947.

There are wall monuments to Justinian Angell (d. 1680) and Margaret Gainsford (d. 1691), and a wall tomb of Richard Marryott (d. 1675). A larger tomb chest is of John Gaynesford (d. 1450).

Crowhurst Place

It faces the east and is surrounded by a moat (GPS: 51.199603, -0.017060).

The property was conveyed for the Gainsford family of the manor who held it from 1418, having acquired it from John atte Hall and Joan (in the customs of the time, presumably his wife).

John Gainsford, who died in 1450, had a younger son William, Knight of the Shire (equivalent to Member of Parliament) for Surrey in the year of his father's death, from whom descended a Gainsford line from Cowden. The Rev. George Gainsford, of this line, retiring as vicar of Hitchin, bought Crowhurst Place about 1905. He died in 1910, and his son the Rev. G. B. Gainsford became the owner.

George A. Crawley, an amateur architect who also designed Westbury House on Long Island in the United States, made alterations during his own residence in the early 20th century, then expanded the building again between 1912 and 1915 for his successor as lessee, Consuelo Vanderbilt.

History
The place-name 'Crowhurst', first recorded in 1189 in various forms similar to those of the next century Croherst and Crauhurste, simply means 'crow wood'.

The Anglo-Saxon administrative division of Tandridge hundred of decreasing use throughout the medieval period, used to be a forum for elders and the overlords of the parish. The Domesday Book (1086) has no record of the place.

Crowhurst takes up a small part of the topsoil above (to quote Malden's Victoria County History of 1911:

Manor
In 1338 Robert de Stangrave and Joan his wife conveyed the manor to John Gainsford and Margaret his wife. The Gainsford family held this until 1706, when it fell to split heirs who entered into disputes, including the full recovery of the large property from a director of the South Sea Company, Edward Gibbon. Thomas and Mary Bates with Richard and Elizabeth Skryne conveyed the manor via Sir John Eyles and other trustees, to the Duchess of Marlborough who used the 'endowed' income of the manor to found the Marlborough almshouses for the poor in need of their own dwellings in St Albans.

Other manors
Three other manors existed: Atgrove, Chellows and Rugge. Each was originally owned by the Gainsford family. A brief-lived fourth manor may have existed, Infields, crossing boundaries by extending into Lingfield and Tandridge, but of its three parts from the 14th century (Mote, Newlands and Maynmead), only Newlands in Tandridge had the wealth and status of a manor. Owen Manning (a noted county historian, who lived 1721–1801) suggests that the name Atgrove survives in Blackgrove Farm, the property of the Gainsford family at the time of his book on Surrey, published posthumously in 1804.

In an iron-producing area, the church's monuments include one cast-iron grave slab. Early in the 19th century a bench was fixed inside the tree, and a wooden door added, with seating for about twelve people. An iron cannonball found in the middle of the tree is still preserved there.

Geography and transport
Gibbs Brook forms part of the boundary with Oxted and was called the Gippes River, and flows into the River Eden, Kent which discharges into the River Medway near Edenbridge.

Most development is in two linear settlements: small detached houses at Ardenrun Shaw, a small wood to the north – only one of these is architecturally listed; St Georges Cottages and its continuation which is narrowly west of the border (in Godstone) Crowhurst Lane End which is mostly semi-detached properties within  of Godstone railway station in the modern settlement of South Godstone along a straight and parallel foot/cyclepath to the railway line. The first neighbourhood has a hall, whereas the second has a public house by a T-junction facing the path.

Roads
The village has a network of minor roads which are not heavily developed, for which reason it is described by the Victoria County History as "it in a peaceful area of the county that has always been tucked away" and has no A-roads.

Demography
Crowhurst had a population in 2001 of 349. The next census, in 2011, recorded 281 people living in 119 households. Its area then was unchanged.

The accommodation in the parish included detached houses (28%), and apartments (22.6%).

The proportion of households in the civil parish who owned their home outright compares to the regional average of 35.1%. The proportion who owned their home with a loan compares to the regional average of 32.5%. The remaining % is made up of rented dwellings (plus a negligible % of households living rent-free).

References

External links
Crowhurst Parish Council

Tandridge
Civil parishes in Surrey
Villages in Surrey